Leeds Hockey Club is a field hockey club that is based at the Sports Park Weetwood in Leeds, West Yorkshire. The club was founded in 1936 as Rawdon and District Hockey Club. The club runs eight men's teams  with the first XI playing in the Men's England Hockey League Division One North and six women's teams with the first XI playing in the Women's England Hockey League Division One North.

References

English field hockey clubs
1936 establishments in England
Sport in Leeds
Sport in West Yorkshire